Okjeo was an ancient Korean tribal state which arose in the northern Korean peninsula from perhaps the 2nd century BCE to the 5th century CE.

Dong-okjeo (Eastern Okjeo) occupied roughly the area of the Hamgyŏng provinces of North Korea, and Buk-okjeo (Northern Okjeo) occupied the Duman River region.

Dong-okjeo was often simply called Okjeo, while Buk-okjeo was also sometimes referred to as Chiguru (置溝婁, 치구루) or Guru (구루), the latter name being also applied to Goguryeo. Okjeo bordered the other minor state of Dongye on the south, and shared a similar fate.

History

In its early history, Okjeo oscillated between domination by the Chinese commanderies and by Goguryeo. From the 3rd century BCE to 108 BCE, it was controlled by Gojoseon. At 107 BCE,  it became part of the  Xuantu Commandery. As the Xuantu Commandery retreated towards the liadong peninsula as a result of expansion of Goguryeo, East okjeo became part of the eastern part of the Lelang Commandery. Due to the constant interference of its neighbours, Okjeo never grew into a fully centralised kingdom. In 28 BCE, King Dongmyeong sent Bu Wiyeom to attack the Northern Okjeo. In the 1st or 2nd century CE, King Taejo of Goguryeo reduced Okjeo to a tributary, which delivered local products to Goguryeo. During the 244 Wei Invasion of Goguryeo, Goguryeo's King Dongcheon briefly retreated to North Okjeo, and in 285, the Buyeo court also temporarily escaped to Okjeo under northern nomadic attacks.

In early 5th century, Okjeo was completely conquered by Gwanggaeto the Great of Goguryeo.

Culture

Knowledge of Okjeo culture is fragmentary. As with the Dongye and Okjeo's language, food, clothing, architecture, and customs were similar to that of Goguryeo. The Okjeo people practised arranged marriage by which the child-bride lived with the child-groom's family until adulthood, and they interred the dead of a family in a single coffin.

Gallery

See also
History of Korea
Dongye
Buyeo
Goguryeo

Notes

References

 

Ancient peoples
Early Korean history
Former countries in Korean history
2nd-century BC establishments
States and territories established in the 2nd century BC
5th-century disestablishments
States and territories disestablished in the 5th century